The ancient Nubian princess Amenirdis II, daughter of the Kushite pharaoh Taharqa of the 25th Dynasty, was adopted by Shepenupet II, daughter of Piye, to become Divine Adoratrice of Amun from around 650 BC to 640 BC during the 26th Dynasty. Amenirdis adopted Nitocris, daughter  of Psamtik I, to become her successor. She may have been married to one of Taharqa's sons, king Atlanersa.

References
 
 Robert Steven Bianchi, Daily Life Of The Nubians, Greenwood Press 2004
 Karol Myśliwiec, The Twilight of Ancient Egypt: First Millennium B.C.E., Cornell University Press 2000
 I. E. S. Edwards, John Boardman, John B. Bury, S. A. Cook, The Cambridge Ancient History, Cambridge University Press 1969
 Aidan Dodson, Monarchs of the Nile, American Univ. in Cairo Press 2000

Further reading

God's Wives of Amun
Princesses of the Twenty-fifth Dynasty of Egypt
7th-century BC Egyptian people
7th-century BC Egyptian women
7th-century BC clergy
Year of birth unknown
Year of death unknown
Taharqa